Kevin Clifford Ashman (born 2 November 1959) is an English quiz player.  He is often considered one of the greatest quizzers in the world, and since 2002 has been a professional quizzer; he has been an Egghead since 2003.  He has won most of the top-level quiz tournaments in which he has taken part, among them several World and European Championships.

Early life
Ashman is from Winchester, Hampshire, He attended St Bede's Primary School and Peter Symonds Grammar School/College. He then graduated from the University of Southampton with a BA degree in Modern History. He became interested in quizzes in his mid-twenties when he resolved to improve his knowledge of the sciences whilst working as a civil servant in the Department for Culture, Media and Sport.

Career
Ashman had his first major television quiz success on Fifteen to One, winning Series 3 in 1989, and returned to win the special 'Millennium Edition' between past champions in 1999. In 1995, he won Mastermind, scoring a record 41 points with no passes in his heat. His specialist subject on that occasion was the life and work of Martin Luther King Jr. He later became the champion after winning the final with the subject Zulu War and, in 2006, appeared on the final of the Junior version encouraging a young contestant who also chose Zulu Wars as his final subject. In 1996, the year following his Mastermind victory, he won Brain of Britain, scoring 38 in his semi final, which remains the highest individual score ever made on the show. He then went on to win Brain of Brains (contested between the previous three years' Brains of Britain) and Top Brain (contested every nine years between the previous three Brain of Brains). Ashman also twice won Master Brain, a radio competition for winners and runners-up of Mastermind and Brain of Britain.

He also won Sale of the Century, Screen Test, Quiz Night, Trivial Pursuit and The Great British Quiz.

Professional

Question-setter for Brain of Britain
Between 2002 and 2006, Ashman was the question-setter and arbiter on the Radio 4 quiz show Brain of Britain, working under the pen-name of 'Jorkins' (a name taken from David Copperfield). He was appointed to the position on the death of Ian Gillies, who worked under the pen-name 'Mycroft'. He left when production moved to Manchester.

Eggheads
Since 2003, he has competed on the British quiz show Eggheads, teamed up with other quiz champions, in which members of the public pit their wits against them in order to win a cash prize. Alongside his Egghead teammates, he also took part in the spin-off show Are You an Egghead?, a competition to find further members of the Egghead team, resulting in the addition of Barry Simmons in 2008 and Pat Gibson in the second series in 2009. For ten years, Ashman had never incorrectly answered a history category question.  This happened for the first time on 6 January 2014.

National and international quizzing championships

Currently ranked World/European number 1, Ashman has 17 gold, 13 silver and 3 bronze medals from the British, European and World Championships, and has been capped 10 times for the England team, with a record of 7 wins and 3 losses. In addition he has won the British Quiz Championship seven times, as well as many other tournaments. In 2004 he won the World Quizzing Championships individual competition, a tournament organised by the newly formed International Quizzing Association (IQA), as well as the European Quizzing Championships (organised by the same group) both individually and for nations, in Gent, Belgium. He followed this up by winning the World Quizzing Championships again in July 2005. He is the first person to retain this title and, for a second year running, he finished ahead of Pat Gibson of Ireland and Nico Pattyn of Belgium. In November 2005 he retained his individual title at the European Quizzing Championships in Tallinn, Estonia. At this event he again captained the England quiz team, this time losing to Belgium in the final. In July 2006 he won the World Quizzing Championships for the third year in succession and followed this in December by again winning the European Quizzing Championships (held near Paris, France). He also won the team title with his team Milhous Warriors, but the English quiz team was once again beaten by the Belgians. In 2007 Ashman lost his World title to Pat Gibson, who narrowly beat him into runner-up spot (a position Gibson himself had occupied for four years). He also lost his European title to Nico Pattyn of Belgium, but he took revenge by regaining the title with the England national team, beating the Belgians in the final at Blackpool. In 2008, in Oslo, this situation was reversed with him being runner-up in the team competition but regaining his singles title. In 2009 he regained the World title, the first player ever to do so, when winning for the 4th time. In 2009 he narrowly missed the British title, losing by a point in a tie-break, to 2008 World Champion Mark Bytheway.

Domestic competition/Quiz leagues

Ashman is a committed quizzer and has three main teams (excluding the Eggheads team on TV). In the QLL he competes with the Allsorts (alongside former Mastermind winner Gavin Fuller) and has won the league on numerous occasions, in the Winchester Quiz League, organised by Peter Byford, he plays for the King Alfred and in national events he plays for the Milhous Warriors. The Milhous Warriors, most of whom are based in Swindon, England, have often emerged victorious in the team elements of events run by Quizzing.co.uk, becoming National Champions at Old Trafford football stadium in 2004 and Silverstone in 2005 as part of those years' UK leg of the World Quizzing Championship event. In 2006 they became the first British team to win the European Team Championship, doing so in Paris. In 2008 they were winners in the final of the Clubs and Institutes (CIU) IDC Freeclaim sponsored national championships.

Personal life
A keen traveller, he lives in Winnall, Winchester in Hampshire. It was revealed on Eggheads on 5 October 2009 that Ashman supports Tottenham Hotspur. He also has an interest in folk music and is a keen theatregoer. He was Peter Kay and Paddy McGuinness' Phone-A-Friend for their appearance on Who Wants to Be a Millionaire? on 12 January 2008.

References 

Alumni of the University of Southampton
People educated at Peter Symonds College
Civil servants in the Department for Culture, Media and Sport
Contestants on British game shows
Living people
IQA team event gold medalists
1959 births
People from Winchester